Sas was, according to the Slavo-Romanian chronicles, the second voivode of Moldavia (c. 1353/1360 – c. 1357/1364). He followed his father Dragoş who had been sent to Moldavia as a representative of king Louis I of Hungary to establish a line of defense against the Golden Horde. All chronicles show that he reigned four years.

According to the sequence of the voivodes listed in the Slavo-Romanian chronicles, he was followed by Bogdan (who would become the first independent ruler of Moldavia), but several historians (e.g., Alexandru Dimitrie Xenopol, Ştefan Pascu) consider Balc as his successor. Victor Spinei thinks that Bogdan came to Moldavia immediately after the death of Sas, before Balc was able to consolidate his reign.

The Drágfi of Béltek family, whose estates would encompass over a hundred villages in the Kingdom of Hungary, descended from one of his sons, Drag.

References

Sources 

Köpeczi, Béla (General Editor) – Makkai, László; Mócsy, András; Szász, Zoltán (Editors) – Barta, Gábor (Assistant Editor): History of Transylvania - Volume I: From the beginnings to 1606; Akadémiai Kiadó, 1994, Budapest; 
Spinei, Victor: Moldavia in the 11th-14th Centuries; Editura Academiei Republicii Socialiste România, 1986, Bucharest
Treptow, Kurt W. – Popa, Marcel: Historical Dictionary of Romania (the list ‘Rulers of Romania – Moldavia’, and entry ‘Dragoş (Mid-14th Century)’); The Scarecrow Press, Inc., 1996, Lanham (Maryland, USA) & Folkestone (UK); 

House of Dragoș
1358 deaths
14th-century Hungarian people
Rulers of Moldavia
Romanians in Hungary
Year of birth unknown
Medieval Hungarian nobility